Rosemarket is a village, parish and community in Pembrokeshire, Wales, north of Milford Haven.

Name
The name does not refer to flowers but to the hundred of Roose, the former Welsh cantref of Rhos.

History
The village was a marcher borough founded by the Knights Hospitallers in the 12th century. It appears on a 1578 parish map of Pembrokeshire. Owen, in 1603, described it as one of nine Pembrokeshire "boroughs in decay".

The parish church, like many in the former lands of Rhos, is dedicated to the 6th-century Breton prince and Welsh saint Ismael. The village has a medieval dovecote and a large hillfort.

Local government
The village has its own elected community council and is part of the electoral ward of Burton for the purposes of elections to Pembrokeshire County Council.

References

Further reading
Nicolle, G. R., Rosemarket: A Village Beyond Wales. Dyfed Cultural Services (1982)

External links

Historical information and sources on GENUKI

Villages in Pembrokeshire
Communities in Pembrokeshire